Felipe Tarsis de Acuña, O.S. (1548 – 20 June 1620) was a Roman Catholic prelate who served as Archbishop of Granada (1616–1620) and Bishop of Palencia (1608–1616).

Biography
Felipe Tarsis de Acuña was born in Valladolid, Spain in 1548 and ordained a priest in the Order of Santiago.
On 11 February 1608, he was appointed during the papacy of Pope Paul V as Bishop of Palencia.
On 24 February 1616, he was appointed during the papacy of Pope Paul V as Archbishop of Granada.
He served as Archbishop of Granada until his death on 20 June 1620.
While bishop, he was the principal co-consecrator of Alonso González Aguilar, Bishop of León (1613).

References

External links and additional sources
 (for Chronology of Bishops) 
 (for Chronology of Bishops) 
 (for Chronology of Bishops) 
 (for Chronology of Bishops) 

17th-century Roman Catholic archbishops in Spain
Bishops appointed by Pope Paul V
1548 births
1620 deaths
Archbishops of Granada